YSR Sunna Vaddi is a welfare program launched by the Government of Andhra Pradesh to assist women from Self Help Groups (SHGs) by providing zero interest loans

Development 
The scheme was launched by Chief minister of Andhra Pradesh Y. S. Jagan Mohan Reddy on 24 April 2020 where ₹1,400 crores was deposited in the accounts of 8.78 lakhs Self help groups with 91 lakh beneficiary women.

The second phase of YSR Sunna Vaddi was launched on 23 April 2021 where ₹1,109 crores was credited into the accounts of 1.02 crore beneficiaries.

The scheme 
YSR Sunna Vaddi scheme was introduced to financially assist women of below poverty line by providing them loans with zero interest. 

Women with outstanding loans up to ₹5 Lakh in both urban and rural banks have been considered eligible to avail the scheme.

References 

Welfare state
Andhra Pradesh
Loans
Poverty activism